Eucteniza is a genus of trapdoor spiders in the family Euctenizidae containing at least 14 species occurring in Mexico and the southern United States. Species are distinguished by a softened rear portion of the carapace, and males possess large spines on the first two pairs of walking legs that are used to hold females during mating. Like other trapdoor spiders they create burrows with a hinged lid, from which they await passing insects and other arthropods to prey upon. Many species are known from only one or two localities, or from only male specimens. More species are expected to be discovered. Eucteniza is closely related to spiders of the genera Entychides and Neoapachella.

Description

The cephalothorax (the anterior body segment bearing the eyes, mouthparts, and legs) is oval, slightly longer than wide, and slopes considerably towards the rear when viewed from the side. The rear third of the carapace (the upper surface of the cephalothorax) is relatively soft, and is distinctly lighter in coloration. The carapace is often devoid of hairs, and in some species fringed with black bristles. The eight eyes are not elevated and are arranged in two rows in a rectangular area: the hind row is recurved, or slightly curved upwards (as in a bowl or shallow U), while the anterior row is slightly procurved (slightly curved downwards, as in an inverted bowl). Eucteniza spiders are colored in various shades of brown, with males generally appearing a dark reddish brown. The jaws (chelicerae) are dark brown. The abdomen sometimes has a dark brown blotch on the upper surface.

In males, the tibiae (5th leg segments) of the first and second walking legs are swollen or enlarged in many species. Additionally, males possess one or two prominent spines, known as "mating claspers" on the first and second tibiae; related genera possess claspers on the first pair of legs only. The size, number, and arrangement of these spines varies between species. Females have a double-toothed groove that the fangs recede into, unlike that of any other euctenizid genus. Both sexes also possess "preening combs", rows of stiff bristles on the rear legs.

Behavior

Like other trapdoor spiders, Eucteniza species construct burrows in the ground with a hinged lid, from which they wait to ambush passing prey. Burrows and prey have been studied in E. relata, and other species are believed to have similar behavior. The burrow is covered with a cork-like lid composed of silk and soil and hinged with silk. The bottom of the burrow accumulates molted exoskeletons and remains of prey, which include beetles, ants, and millipedes. Burrows of adults and juveniles have been found in close proximity, suggesting individuals do not disperse very far after hatching. Individuals in Texas disperse from their burrows between August and January, and hence are most often collected during this time. In Mexico, the dispersal period extends from June to January.

Habitat
The predominant habitat of Eucteniza is desert and tropical dry forest of Mexico and Texas. Burrows are located on flat ground or slight inclines. In southern Texas, E. relata may burrow in residential lawns, and may be particularly likely to be encountered after rains. Eucteniza spiders are generally difficult to find in the wild, and are rare in museum collections.

Predators
E. relata in Texas is thought to be preyed upon by tarantula hawk wasps in the genus Pepsis, which are known to paralyze tarantulas and other spiders to provide food for their young. Observations suggest female Pepsis seek out Eucteniza hosts and sting them in their burrows, leaving them paralyzed within.

Taxonomy

The taxonomic history of Eucteniza spiders includes nearly 20 named species and four genera; the three additional generic names are now considered taxonomic synonyms of Eucteniza, and several named species have similarly been determined to be synonyms of previously described species.

The genus Eucteniza was established by Austrian naturalist Anton Ausserer in 1875 with the description of Eucteniza mexicana. In 1895, the English zoologist and reverend Octavius Pickard-Cambridge described the new genera Favila and Enrico for the new species relatus and mexicanus, respectively. Shortly thereafter, the reverend's nephew Frederick O. Pickard-Cambridge transferred F. relatus to Eucteniza, rendering Favila a junior synonym of Eucteniza. Similarly, the elder Pickard-Cambridge's Enrico mexicanus was synonymized with Eucteniza in 2002, which required a name change to avoid confusion with Ausserer's Eucteniza mexicana. Thus Enrico mexicanus was given the replacement name Eucteniza atoyacensis.

In 1940, the American biologist Ralph V. Chamberlin described Astrosoga rex, a new genus and species from Texas, while Willis J. Gertsch and Stanley Mulaik described A. stolida, also from Texas. Both species of Astrosoga  were transferred to Eucteniza in 2002.

Many taxonomic changes occurred in a 2013 revision by American biologists Jason Bond and Rebecca Godwin. Twelve new species were described, many named after nearby localities, indigenous peoples, or Mexican historic figures. Namesakes of other species include the nightclub Cabo Wabo of Cabo San Lucas, and a character from Battlestar Galactica. Both E. rex and E. stolida were synonymized with E. relata, and the previously described E. atoyacensis (Pickard-Cambridge's Enrico mexicanus) was declared a dubious name: since it was originally described based on a juvenile specimen, it is unclear whether it represents a distinct species.  Thus, as of 2013 a total of 14 valid species are recognized.

Species and distribution
The different species of Eucteniza are distinguished by differences in body size, limb proportions, number of tibial spines, and shape of female sperm receptacles, as well as geographic location. Most species are known from male specimens only, but E. rosalia and E. panchovillai are known only from female specimens. Eucteniza species are distributed throughout central and northern Mexico, much of Texas, and the lower part of the Baja Peninsula. Many species are only known from the type locality, the site where the type specimen or specimens were originally collected. The species with the largest range is E. relata, although Bond and Godwin assert the species is actually composed of multiple as-yet-unnamed cryptic species (distinct species erroneously grouped into one) that will require additional morphological or genetic research to distinguish.

Classification
Eucteniza is the type genus of the family Euctenizidae (the "wafer trapdoor spiders"), a mygalomorph family formerly considered a subfamily of the Cyrtaucheniidae. Within Euctenizidae, Eucteniza is classified in the subfamily Euctenizinae. Earlier comparisons of morphological and behavioral traits suggested the closest relative of Eucteniza is Neoapachella rothi, a forest dwelling spider found in Arizona and New Mexico, while more recent studies, including analyses of DNA similarities, suggest a closer relationship to Entychides, a genus with several species ranging from Arizona to Texas into Mexico.

Notes

References

Further reading

External links

Eucteniza at World Spider Catalog

Euctenizidae
Mygalomorphae genera
Spiders of Mexico
Spiders of the United States
Fauna of the Baja California Peninsula